Plumbo is a Norwegian rock and folk rock band from Sande, Vestfold, Norway. The three-piece band consists of Lars Erik Blokkhus (vocals, guitar), Tommy Elstad (bass) and Hasse Rønningen (drums), with assistance from supporting musician Glenn Hauger on accordion and flute. Their repertoire includes Norwegian songs with a traditional twist, rock music elements and international appeal.

The name Plumbo is taken from a brand of drain cleaner sold in Norway.

Members
Current
 Lars Erik Blokkhus – lead vocalist, guitar (1999–present)
 Tommy Løken-Elstad – bass, backing vocals (1999–present)
 Glenn Hauger – drums (1999-2002), accordion, flute, guitar (2010–present)
 Tor Erik "Elg" Knudsen – drums, backing vocals (2012–present)
 Henning Hoel Eriksen - keyboards, backing vocals (2014–present)

Previous
 Reidar Fiskebøl – drums (2002-2005, 2007)
 Dag Arve Sandnes - guitar (1999-2001)
 Nils-Magne Pettersen - keyboards (2003-2008)
 Hans Inge Rønningen – drums, backing vocals (2006, 2007-2012)
 Tom Erik Rønningen - guitar, backing vocals (2013-2016)

History
The band's first release was the album Full åpning in 2002. Their next album, På vei til Harryland!, came in 2007. The band's breakthrough came with Råkk'n Råll Harry reaching No. 11 on the Norwegian Albums Chart. Their biggest hit song is the 2011 single "Møkkamann" from that album that peaked at number one in the Norwegian Singles Chart and subsequently won "Hit of the Year 2011" at Spellemannprisen 2012. based on votes from the general public. In 2011, the band entered the "Drømmelåta i Holmestrand" music competition, produced by TV 2, with their song "Drømmeland". After winning the Spellemannprisen, "Møkkamann" topped the VG-lista, the official Norwegian Singles Chart. Plumbo appears at gatebil rudskogen every summer.

"Møkkamann" controversy
On 14 January 2012, during the annual Spellemannprisen in Oslo, Plumbo gained some negative attention after lead singer Lars Erik Blokkhus accepted the prize for best song, for "Møkkamann" (roughly translated as "Dirt man" or "Shit man"). He proceeded to make a remark, meant as a joke, to the dark-skinned hosts Tshawe Baqwa and Yosef Wolde-Mariam, members of the popular Norwegian duo Madcon, saying that seeing them he thought the song got a new name; Mokkamann (literally Mocha man). After his remark, Blokkhus apologized for his comment.

Discography

Albums

Live albums / DVDs

Compilation albums
Live albums / DVDs

Singles

References

External links
Official website
Fansite
LastFM

Norwegian folk rock groups
Musical groups established in 2002
2002 establishments in Norway
Musical groups from Vestfold
Sande, Vestfold